Andrew Steven Hall (born November 26, 1980) is a former American football quarterback of the National Football League, Arena Football League and af2. He was drafted by the Philadelphia Eagles in the sixth round of the 2004 NFL Draft. He played college football at Georgia Tech before transferring to Delaware.

Early years
Hall attended Cheraw High School in Cheraw, South Carolina, where he lettered in football and baseball.  Playing pitcher, he led the school's baseball team to the South Carolina AA State Championship title, during which he pitched a no-hitter in the championship game, and was selected to the North/South All-Star team. He was named 2a player of the year as a senior in baseball while leading the state in home runs. He was named to the South Carolina Shrine bowl football team as a senior.

College career
Hall attended the University of Delaware and led the Fightin' Blue Hens to the 2003 Division I-AA National Championship. He transferred to Delaware after starting his career at Georgia Tech. His wife, Mary Melissa Bailey, was a Georgia Tech cheerleader, seven-time All-American cheerleader, and 2004 Cheersport National Partner Stunt Champion with King Harrison.

In 2003, while on the way to the national championship, Hall was named the Atlantic 10 Conference's offensive player of the year. He was also honored as the Tri-State Player of the Year, University of Delaware Male Athlete of the Year, and finished third for the Walter Payton Award, all during his senior year at Delaware. He completed 62 percent of his passes for 2,764 yards and 25 touchdowns. Hall also ran for 710 yards and eight more touchdowns.

Hall finished his college career at Delaware with a school-record 57.4 completion percentage for 4,596 yards and 34 touchdowns. He also became fifth on the school's all-time list with 6,169 yards of total offense.

Professional career

Philadelphia Eagles
Hall was drafted by the Philadelphia Eagles with the 185th overall selection in the sixth round of the 2004 NFL Draft and spent two years with the team. Before the 2005 season, he was allocated to the Rhein Fire of NFL Europe.

Las Vegas Gladiators
Hall was acquired by the Las Vegas Gladiators of the Arena Football League before the 2006 season.

Nashville Kats
Hall spent the 2007 season with the Nashville Kats.

Austin Wranglers
Hall played for the Austin Wranglers in 2008, where he led the team to the playoffs and was named to the All-Arena League Team.

References

External links

USA Today 2004 draft analysis
Quarterback Andy Hall to play for Rhein Fire
Delaware Blue Hens football: Hall recalls 2003 national title

1980 births
American football quarterbacks
People from Cheraw, South Carolina
Delaware Fightin' Blue Hens football players
Georgia Tech Yellow Jackets football players
Las Vegas Gladiators players
Living people
Nashville Kats players
Philadelphia Eagles players
Rhein Fire players
Austin Wranglers players